There was an extended royal presence in Canada through the 18th, 19th, and 20th centuries, either as an official tour, a vacation, a period of military service, or a viceregal posting by a member of the Royal Family. Originally, royal tours of Canada were events predominantly for Canadians to see and possibly meet members of their Royal Family, with the associated patriotic pomp and spectacle. However, nearing the end of the 20th century, such occasions took on the added dimension of a theme, and junior members of the Royal Family began to undertake unofficial "working" tours of Canada as well; in this method, royal figures are invited by provinces, municipalities, and other organizations to events which the latter fund without assistance from the federal government. The Prince of Wales, The Princess Royal, The Duke of York and The Prince Edward, have all made several small tours in this fashion. These arrangements then continued on into the 21st century.

18th century

19th century

20th century

1900–1949

1950–1959

1960–1969

1970–1979

1980–1989

1990–1999

See also
Royal tours of Canada
List of royal tours of Canada (21st century)
List of Commonwealth visits made by Queen Elizabeth II
Royal and viceroyal transport in Canada

References

Monarchy in Canada
1700
Tours of Canada
Canada history-related lists